The Punjab Women Protection Authority is an authority established by the Government of Punjab, Pakistan to protect the women by establishing Violence against Women Centers across Punjab, Pakistan.

See also
 Aman (Islam), Islamic term for offering safety, protection, safe conduct, or pardon to enemies

References

External links
 "Dar-ul-aman", also spelled "darul aman", lit. "house of aman (protection)", is the term used for women's shelters in Pakistan and Afghanistan, with dozens of articles published by The Express Tribune, some of them referring to the Punjab Women Protection Authority. Search for dar-ul-aman on their website.

Government agencies of Punjab, Pakistan
2017 establishments in Pakistan
Violence against women in Pakistan
Women's rights in Pakistan